The 2020 United States House of Representatives elections in Idaho were held on November 3, 2020, to elect the two U.S. representatives from the state of Idaho, one from both of the state's congressional districts. The elections coincided with the 2020 U.S. presidential election, as well as other elections to the House of Representatives, elections to the United States Senate and various state and local elections.

District 1

The 1st district takes in the Idaho Panhandle and the western Boise area. The incumbent is Republican Russ Fulcher, who was elected with 62.8% of the vote in 2018.

Republican primary

Candidates

Declared
Russ Fulcher, incumbent U.S. Representative
Nicholas Jones, lecturer and businessman

Primary results

Democratic primary

Candidates

Declared
Staniela Nikolova, law student at the University of Idaho, former Idaho Senate page, and candidate for Idaho's 1st congressional district in 2016
Rudy Soto, member of the Northern Shoshone tribe and U.S. Army National Guard veteran

Endorsements

Primary results

Libertarian primary

Candidates

Declared
Joe Evans, data engineer and former military intelligence analyst

General election

Predictions

Results

District 2

The 2nd district encompasses eastern and northern Boise, as well as Eastern Idaho. The incumbent is Republican Mike Simpson, who was re-elected with 60.7% of the vote in 2018.

Republican primary

Candidates

Declared
Kevin Rhoades, former mixed martial arts fighter and candidate for the Idaho House of Representatives in 2018
Mike Simpson, incumbent U.S. Representative

Primary results

Democratic primary

Candidates

Declared
Aaron Swisher, economist and nominee in  2018

Primary results

Constitution primary

Candidates

Declared
 Pro-Life, anti-abortion activist, farmer, and perennial candidate

Libertarian primary

Candidates

Declared
Idaho Sierra Law, environmental activist and perennial candidate

General election

Predictions

Results

See also
 2020 Idaho elections

References

External links
 
 
  (State affiliate of the U.S. League of Women Voters)
 

Official campaign websites for 1st district candidates
 Joe Evans (L) for Congress
 Russ Fulcher (R) for Congress
 Rudy Soto (D) for Congress 

Official campaign websites for 2nd district candidates
 Mike Simpson (R) for Congress
 Aaron Swisher (D) for Congress

Idaho
2020
House